Statistics of Latvian Higher League in the 1924 season.

Overview
RFK won the championship.

League standings

Kaiserwald withdrew after 2 rounds because of the decision of Latvia Football Union (LFS - Latvijas Futbola Savieniba) which prohibited foreign players to participate in the championship.

2nd stage: RFK [Riga] - Cesu VB [Cesis]  5-1

References

RSSSF

1924
Lat
Lat
Football Championship